In 2002 Tipperary competed in the National Hurling League and the Munster and All-Ireland championships. It was Nicky English's fourth year in charge of the team with Tommy Dunne also in his forth year as team captain. Finches continued as sponsors of Tipperary GAA.

National Hurling League

Division 1B Table

2002 Munster Senior Hurling Championship

2002 All-Ireland Senior Hurling Championship

Awards
Tipperary won two All Star Awards with Paul kelly winning his first and Eoin Kelly winning his second award. Eoin Kelly also won for the second year in a row the Young hurler of the year award

References

External links
Tipperary GAA Archives 2002
2002 Teams and Results at Premierview

Tipp
Tipperary county hurling team seasons